In the run up to the general election of 2001, several polling organisations carried out opinion polling in regards to voting intention in Great Britain (i.e. the UK excluding Northern Ireland, which is usually excluded from such voting intention surveys). Results of such polls are displayed below.

The election took place on 7 June 2001. The previous general election was held on 1 May 1997, and had seen Labour return to power with a landslide victory after 18 years, led by Tony Blair. Such was the scale of Labour's victory that it was widely accepted - even within the Conservative Party - that the next election would produce another Labour victory, with the best realistic target for other parties being to reduce the Labour majority (recognised by Cecil Parkinson on Election Night 1997 when he stated on the BBC's broadcast that it "was a two term Labour government").

The parliamentary term of 1997-2001 had seen the opinion polls led by the Labour Party, mostly with a lead in excess of 10 points, over the Conservatives (who had replaced John Major with William Hague as their new leader), apart from a brief spell in the autumn of 2000 when fuel protests threatened to bring Britain to a standstill. However, the blockades which had caused the protests were quickly resolved and Labour support recovered to the extent that Blair felt able to call an election for 3 May 2001, although the recent foot and mouth crisis meant that the election was delayed for five weeks until 7 June.

Another rare success for the Conservatives during this parliamentary term came in June 1999, when it enjoyed the largest share of the votes in the European parliament elections, with William Hague vowing to keep the pound as Britain's currency, whereas Tony Blair was refusing to rule out eventually adopting the Euro.

In the event, the election produced a low turnout (with many voters perhaps feeling that another Labour victory was inevitable) and Labour won a second successive landslide, with the British political scene remaining almost completely unchanged with only a few seats changing hands.

All polling data is from Ipsos MORI, UK polling Report and BBC News.

Exit polls 
Two exit polls conducted by MORI for ITV and NOP for BBC was published at the end of voting at 10 pm, predicting the number of seats for each party.

Graphical Summary

National poll results

2001

2000

1999

1998

1997

Nations Polling

Northern Ireland 
Data from BBC News

Scotland 
Data from BBC News

Wales 
Data from BBC News

References

2001 United Kingdom general election
Opinion polling for United Kingdom general elections
Opinion polling for United Kingdom votes in the 2000s